Salu is a village in Rae Parish, Harju County, in northern Estonia. It has a population of 76 (as of 1 January 2010).

In 2005, the 12th century treasure trove Ubina Hoard was discovered in Salu.

Population

References

Villages in Harju County